Gurukiran or Gurukiran Shetty is an Indian music director of the Kannada film industry in India. He started his career as a music director of the Kannada movie A, directed and acted by Upendra. His music for his next movie Upendra further consolidated his position in Kannada movie industry. He is a native of Mangalore and hails from Bunt Family. His mother tongue is Tulu. He has also acted in several movies in supporting character roles and also sung several songs and also composed in Tamil and Telugu cinema.

Career
Gurukiran entered the film industry as an actor before becoming a music director. He had sung many songs in Kannada films in his own composition as well as others."Kanasina Maratta" song sung by him, is a big hit in Banna Bannada Loka; Thomas Rathnam directed the music.

Personal Life
He is married to Pallavi, who is a cousin of actor Sunil.

Discography

Composer

Filmography

Awards

Karnataka State Film Awards:
 2011 – Karnataka State Film Award for Best Music Director – Mylari
South Indian International Movie Awards 
 Nominated —2012 – SIIMA Award for Best Music Director – Govindaya Namaha
Filmfare Awards South:
 2001 – Filmfare Award for Best Music Director - Kannada – Chitra
 2002 – Filmfare Award for Best Music Director - Kannada – Dhum

References

External links 
 
Gurukiran website

Music directors
Kannada film score composers
Male actors in Kannada cinema
Indian male film actors
Kannada playback singers
Living people
Mangaloreans
Musicians from Mangalore
Filmfare Awards South winners
Tulu people
Film musicians from Karnataka
Indian male playback singers
20th-century Indian composers
20th-century Indian singers
Indian male film score composers
20th-century Indian male singers
1970 births